The 2006 Wildwater Canoeing World Championships was the 25th edition of the global wildwater canoeing competition, Wildwater Canoeing World Championships, organised by the International Canoe Federation.

Podiums

Classic

K1

C1

C2

Sprint

K1

C1

C2

Medal table

See also
 Wildwater canoeing

References

External links
 

Wildwater Canoeing World Championships